Mount Donkin is a  summit in British Columbia, Canada.

Description

Mount Donkin is located in Glacier National Park and is part of the Selkirk Mountains. Precipitation runoff from the mountain drains into tributaries of the Incomappleux River. Mount Donkin is more notable for its steep rise above local terrain than for its absolute elevation. The nearest higher neighbor is Michel Peak on Mount Dawson,  to the east.

History
While in the Selkirks in 1888, Rev. William Spotswood Green, Alpine Club, London, named this mountain after fellow club member William Frederick Donkin (1845–1888), Honorary Secretary of the Alpine Club, who perished that year in the Caucasus. The nearby Mount Fox was also named in memory of another member of the club, Harry Fox, who also perished with Donkin during their attempt to be the first to climb Koshtan-Tau. The bodies of Donkin, Fox, and their two Swiss guides (Kaspar Streich and Johann Fischer) were never found.

The first ascent of the summit was made in 1890 by Harold Ward Topham, who also has a nearby mountain named after him, Mount Topham.

The mountain's toponym was officially adopted on May 29, 1901, by the Geographical Names Board of Canada.

Climate

Based on the Köppen climate classification, Mount Donkin is located in a subarctic climate zone with cold, snowy winters, and mild summers. Winter temperatures can drop below −20 °C with wind chill factors below −30 °C. This climate supports the Donkin Glacier on the northeast slope of the peak.

See also
Geography of British Columbia

References

External links
 Glacier National Park: Parks Canada
 Mount Donkin: Weather
 William Frederick Donkin in memoriam: Google.com/books

Two-thousanders of British Columbia
Selkirk Mountains
Kootenay Land District
Glacier National Park (Canada)